Celine Dion Live 2017 was the twelfth concert tour by Canadian singer Celine Dion. It was organized to support Dion's 2016 French-language studio album, Encore un soir. In the anglophone shows Dion performed her single "How does a moment last forever" (from the 2017 film "Beauty and the beast") along with a few rare songs and fan favourites. With twenty five shows, it began in Copenhagen, Denmark on 15 June 2017 and concluded on 5 August 2017 in Glasgow, Scotland.

Background

After Dion's last large-scale world tour in 2008 and 2009 in support for her album Taking Chances, she began a new residence show at The Colosseum At Caesar's Palace in Las Vegas in 2011 with a contract until 2019. On 25 January 2017, Dion's official website announced sixteen shows in Europe to take place during the summer months of 2017. Tickets for those shows went on-sale to the general public on 3 February 2017. Eight additional dates, in London, Paris, Lille, Manchester, Birmingham and Berlin were later added. On 31 March 2017, The SSE Hydro posted an intimation of a concert in Glasgow, Scotland. Details for this show were announced during the first week of April 2017. Véronic DiCaire joined Dion as the opening act.

On 14 June 2017, it was announced that both shows scheduled to take place at Manchester Arena on 25 June and 1 August would be rescheduled due to ongoing investigation after the Manchester Arena bombing. The shows were rescheduled to be at the First Direct Arena in Leeds  on 25 June 2017 and 2 August 2017.

Critical reception
The tour received positive reviews. The Independent rated the concert five stars out of five, calling it "a flawless show with zero pretence" with Dion's "unstoppable vocals". The Guardian rated the concert four stars out of five. London Evening Standard also rated it four stars out of five, writing that Dion "didn't just crank out soulful power ballads" but she was also "a stage-strutting, air-punching, kiss-blowing bundle of fun, gratitude and good humour". Gay Times also praised the show, writing that Dion proved she's very much at the height of her career. In a positive review Metro wrote that Dion's "vocals can easily be considered the eighth wonder of the world". According to a positive review by the Official Charts Company, Dion's concert was "almost a religious experience". Her concert in Leeds, on 25 June, was given a five star rating by the Manchester Evening News. Performing on a stage with a backdrop of "Leeds in loving support of Manchester", Dion was praised for her boundless energy and note and pitch perfect performance.

Broadcasts and recordings 
Dion's team recorded two shows in Paris (8 and 9 July) as well as two shows in London (29 and 30 July.) However, there has been no confirmation regarding possible CD/DVD release. On 26 January 2018, a recording of "Encore un soir" was broadcast on TF1 as part of "Jean-Jacques Goldman, 40 years in music."

Commercial reception
Dion sold-out all of her European concerts. She also broke records across the United Kingdom as the highest grossing artist at each UK venue where she performed.

Band

 Musical Director, Piano: Scott Price
 Drums: Dominique Messier
 Bass: Yves Labonté
 Guitars: Kaven Girouard
 Keyboards: Guillaume Marchand 
 Percussion: Paul Picard 
 Background Vocals & Tin Whistle: Élise Duguay
 Background Vocals: Barnev Valsaint, Dawn Cumberbatch
 Violins: Philippe Dunnigan, Jenny Elfving, Laraine Kaizer, Rebecca Ramsey, Svetlin Belneev, Lisa Dondlinger, Lenka Hajkova, John Arnold, De Ann Letourneau
 Violas: Jerome Gordon, Kaila Potts, Dmitri Kourka
 Celli: Lindsey Springer, Raymond Sicam III, Irina Chirkova, Judy Kang, Élise Duguay
 Woodwinds: Eric Tewalt, Philip Wigfall
 Trumpets: Matt Fronke, Kurt Evanson, Nico Edgerman, Don Lorice
 Trombones: Daniel Falcone, Nathan Tanouye

Set list

 
Additional Notes

"I'm Your Angel", "My Love", "Treat Her Like a Lady" and "Misled" were performed only during the concert in Copenhagen
"Loved Me Back to Life" was performed from 15 to 20 June 2017.
"Ordinaire" was performed during the concert in Bordeaux.
"The Reason" and "The Colour of My Love" were removed from the set list after six concerts. 
"The Show Must Go On" was not performed during the second concert in Berlin.
"Pour que tu m'aimes encore" was not performed during the concert in Glasgow.
Only during shows in France was "Pour que tu m'aimes encore" performed in an acoustic version only accompanied by a guitar.

Tour dates

See also
Un peu de nous

Notes

References

2017 concert tours
Celine Dion concert tours